I Like Movies is a 2022 Canadian comedy drama film written and directed by Chandler Levack. Set in the early 2000s, the film stars Isaiah Lehtinen as Lawrence, a socially inept 17-year-old cinephile who gets a job at a video store, where he forms a complicated friendship with his older female manager.

The film is produced by Lindsay Blair Goeldner with original score by Murray Lightburn from the Dears. Its cast also includes Romina D'Ugo, Krista Bridges, Percy Hynes White, Dan Beirne, Andy McQueen, Rodrigo Fernandez-Stoll, and Alex Ateah.

Levack has described the film as being based in part on her own teenage job in a video store, although she has stated that she chose to write the central character as male out of a desire to push back against the popular notion that women filmmakers can only tell female-oriented stories.

The film had its world premiere in the Discovery section of the Toronto International Film Festival on September 9, 2022. It was released theatrically in Canada on March 10, 2023, by Mongrel Media, and has been picked up for worldwide distribution by Visit Films.

Cast
 Isaiah Lehtinen as Lawrence Kweller
 Romina D'Ugo as Alana
 Tanner Zipchen 
 Anand Rajaram
 Rodrigo Fernandez-Stoll
 Dan Beirne
 Andy McQueen
 Percy Hynes White as Matt Macarchuck
 Krista Bridges

Critical response
On the review aggregator website Rotten Tomatoes, the film holds an approval rating of 100% based on 24 reviews, with an average rating of 8.1/10. Rachel Ho of That Shelf praised Lehtinen's performance in the lead role, and wrote, "While based loosely on her own life, Levack's gender swap proves to be a fascinating element of the film. Though a young boy is the focus, the fact that the film is being told through a female lens is felt throughout. Even more interesting is the new perspective gained from the 2003 setting—suddenly that budding film bro doesn't seem so precocious. I Like Movies is deceptive in that sense; on the surface, it may appear to be a typical endearing coming-of-age tale steeped in early-2000s nostalgia. But there's a compelling narrative under the formula that highlights the exciting talent of a new filmmaker."

For Cult MTL, Alex Rose wrote that "Though obviously borrowing from retail-work staples of the video store era like Clerks, Empire Records or High Fidelity, Levack brings an incredible attention to detail to every frame of I Like Movies. Packed with MuchMusic-adjacent turn-of-the-century pop-punk (and a score by Murray A. Lightburn of the Dears), a truly Canadian sense of scale (much of Lawrence’s obsession with NYU also stems from his desire to avoid becoming a Canadian filmmaker — in his American-auteur-addled brain, nothing could be worse) and discussions of Jimmy Fallon’s unsatisfying run on Weekend Update, it should prove a potent antidote to Gen Z’s growing obsession with early 2000s aesthetics while also sending most people my age into a tizzy of anti-nostalgia."

The film was named to TIFF's annual year-end Canada's Top Ten list for 2022.

Awards
At the 2022 Calgary International Film Festival, the film won the $10,000 RBC Emerging Artist Award.

The film won four awards at the Vancouver Film Critics Circle Awards 2022, for Best Canadian Film, Best Actor in a Canadian Film (Lehtinen), Supporting Actor in a Canadian Film (Hynes White) and Best Screenplay for a Canadian Film (Levack).

References

External links
 

2022 films
2022 comedy-drama films
2022 directorial debut films
2020s Canadian films
2020s coming-of-age comedy-drama films
Canadian coming-of-age comedy-drama films
English-language Canadian films
Films set in the 2000s
Films shot in Ontario
Workplace comedy films